This is a list of footballers who have made between 25 and 99 competitive appearances for Oldham Athletic A.F.C. since the club joined the football league in 1907.

References

Players
 
Oldham Athletic
Association football player non-biographical articles